Qasim Zia (born 7 August 1961 in Lahore, Punjab) Pakistani politician and former field hockey player. He was appointed as President, Pakistan Hockey Federation in October 2008.

He was a member of the Provincial Assembly of the Punjab, Pakistan during 2002–07 and functioned as the Leader of Opposition. He was returned to the Punjab Assembly for the second consecutive term in the bye-elections in 2008. He has extensively travelled abroad. His granduncle, Mian Amiruddin, and his cousin, Khawaja Tariq Rahim, had served as Governors of Punjab. His grandfather, Mian Aminuddin, was the first Mayor of Lahore. His uncle, Mian Salahuddin remained MNA and Provincial Minister and his cousin, Mian Yousuf Salahuddin, served as a Member of the Punjab Assembly during 1988–90.

Qasim Zia was appointed as the 23rd president of the Pakistan Hockey Federation (PHF) by Prime Minister Yousuf Raza Gillani on 15 October 2008.

Personal life
Qasim Zia got married in November 1986 and has three children. He belongs to the well-known  Mian family of Baghbanpura, Lahore and is the grandson of veteran Pakistani politician and former Governor of Punjab, Pakistan, Mian Aminuddin who also had served as the first Mayor of Lahore after the independence of Pakistan in 1947. His cousin Mian Yousuf Salahuddin is a PTV producer and had also served as Member of Punjab Assembly in Pakistan from 1988 to 1990.

He educated at the Aitchison College, Lahore.

Awards and recognition
Keeping in view his services to Pakistan Hockey and his 25 years of services to Pakistani politics, the President of Pakistan awarded Sitara-e-Imtiaz to him in 2014.

Before that, he had received a Pride of Performance Award for Sports from the President of Pakistan in 2011.

Political career

Pakistan Peoples Party (Parliamentarian)
Information Secretary	(1997–2001)
President	(2001–2007)
Member CEC	(2007)

References

External links
 
 Qasim Zia's profile – Punjab Assembly

1961 births
Living people
Pakistani male field hockey players
Olympic field hockey players of Pakistan
Pakistan Hockey Federation presidents
Pakistan People's Party MPAs (Punjab)
Peoples Students Federation
Field hockey players from Lahore
Pakistani sportsperson-politicians
Punjab MPAs 2002–2007
Medalists at the 1984 Summer Olympics
Olympic gold medalists for Pakistan
Asian Games gold medalists for Pakistan
Asian Games silver medalists for Pakistan
Asian Games medalists in field hockey
Field hockey players at the 1982 Asian Games
Field hockey players at the 1984 Summer Olympics
Field hockey players at the 1986 Asian Games
Medalists at the 1982 Asian Games
Medalists at the 1986 Asian Games
Mian family
Punjab MPAs 2008–2013
Leaders of the Opposition in the Provincial Assembly of the Punjab
Olympic medalists in field hockey
Aitchison College alumni